Koogi is a village in Jõelähtme Parish, Harju County in northern Estonia. It's lies on the left bank of the Jägala River. The Tallinn–Narva road (nr 1, part of E20) passes Koogi and has an intersection with Jägala–Aegviidu–Käravete road (nr 13). Koogi has 95 inhabitants (2005).

Gallery

References

Villages in Harju County